Rosita Yarza (5 November 1922 – 13 October 1996) was a Spanish film actress who appeared in around thirty films including The Man Who Wanted to Kill Himself (1942) in which she played the female lead.

Selected filmography
 The Man Who Wanted to Kill Himself (1942)
 Malvaloca (1942)
 Mariona Rebull (1947)
 Two Degrees of Ecuador (1953)
 Alfonso XII and María Cristina (1960)
 Behind the Mask of Zorro (1966)

References

Bibliography 
 Bentley, Bernard. A Companion to Spanish Cinema. Boydell & Brewer 2008.

External links 
 

1922 births
1996 deaths
Spanish film actresses
People from Madrid
20th-century Spanish actresses